Kst is a plotting and data viewing program. It is a general purpose plotting software program that evolved out of a need to visualize and analyze astronomical data, but has also found subsequent use in the real time display of graphical information.  Kst is a KDE application and is freely available for anyone to download and use under the terms of the GPL.  It is noted for being able to graph real-time data acquisition.

History
Kst was initially developed by Barth Netterfield, an astrophysicist as a personal project.  By 2004 it had begun to be used in various universities and the European Space Agency and development was funded by the Canadian Space Agency.  Kst is written in C++ and based upon the Tk tollkit.  It is targeted towards large (million element) data sets.

Features
kst is a fast real-time large-dataset plotting and viewing tool with basic data analysis functionality.

Plot types
kst is able to plot histograms and 3-D with color and contour mapping for 3-D images.  It is also able to process Network Common Data Form (NETCDF) files for 2-d plotting

Real-time plotting capability
Kst has been chosen where there is a need to present plots in real-time.

Applications
Real-time applications vary in size from simple graphing of a sensor from a microcontroller such as arduino that may be set up by a hobbyist to a simple sensor to plotting of real time date from the Atacama Cosmology Telescope.  The program has been recommended for real time graphical display of an open energy monitoring project.

Inputs
Kst is able to accept a number input formats with Dirfiles being particularly suitable for streaming applications and plug-in extension filters enabling other input stream types and file formats to be added.

Scripting language
The tool offers a scripting language, termed KstScript based upon JavaScript syntax which can help automate workflows.

Alternatives
Some alternatives include MATLAB, Qtiplot, SciDAVis, Grace and LabPlot. However, some of these are part of a numerical analysis package.

Spin-off developments

Dirfile format
In the process of developing the kst application a spin-off was the emergence of the Dirfile file format standard for time-ordered binary data in an efficient manner.  It was developed under the Getdata project into an independent standard with its own API.

See also

 List of graphing software
 QtiPlot, for scientific graphing and data analysis
 SciDAVis
 LabPlot
 HippoDraw

External links
 kst webpage

Notes and references

Notes

References

Free plotting software
KDE Applications
Plotting software